In Switzerland, a popular initiative (German: Volksinitiative, French: Initiative populaire, Italian: Iniziativa popolare, Romansh: Iniziativa dal pievel) allows the people to suggest law on a national, cantonal, and municipal level. On a federal level it may only change the federal constitution, not propose an ordinary law. Along with the popular referendum and in some cantons recall elections, it is a form of direct democracy.

History 
Popular initiatives were introduced as a tool at the federal level in the 1891 partial revision of the Swiss Federal Constitution. 
Between 1893 and 2014, out of a total of 192 federal initiatives put to the vote,  22  were successful. Another 73 were withdrawn, mostly in favour of a counter-proposal.

The first successful initiative was the first ever launched, asking for "prohibition of slaughter without prior anesthesia" (ostensibly phrased as a matter of animal rights, but in practice directed against shechita in particular, a practice that remains outlawed in Switzerland to the present day).

The successful initiatives date to the following years:
1893, 1908 (absinthe), 1918, 1920 (gambling), 1921, 1928 (gambling), 1949, 1982, 1987 (protection of wetlands), 1990 (nuclear power moratorium), 1993 (National Day), 1994 (protection of alpine ecosystems), 2002 (UN membership), 2004, 2005, 2008, 2009 (minaret ban), 2010, 2012, 2013 (executive pay), 2014 (immigration), 2014 (paedophile work ban).

Successful initiatives were thus quite rare, with a gap of 20 years during 1929–1949, and even of more than  30 years during 1949–1982 during which not a single initiative found favour with the electorate. 
In the 21st century, the picture changes significantly, with five successful initiatives during the 2000s, and another five just during 2010–2014.

Among the 170 rejected initiatives (as of October 2014), there are several that still played a major role in Swiss politics. Notable among them, also for the high voter turnout they inspired, were the anti-immigration initiatives of James Schwarzenbach in 1970 and 1974 (74.7% and 70.3% turnout, respectively), and the 1989 initiative with the aim of abolishing the Swiss Army (69.2% turnout).

Federal popular initiative 

The federal popular initiative (German: Eidgenössische Volksinitiative, French: Initiative populaire fédérale, Italian: Iniziativa popolare federale) is an instrument of direct democracy in Switzerland. It allows citizens to propose changes to the Swiss Federal Constitution. A votation will be organised for every proposition of modification that collected 100,000 valid signatures in 18 months.

The most frequent themes tackled by initiatives are healthcare, taxes, welfare, drug policy, public transport, immigration, asylum, and education. There are only two kinds of restrictions on the content:
Formal criteria (the initiative should deal with one topic at a time, etc.)
The initiative should not infringe on the core of the human rights, known as jus cogens.

It is different from the mandatory referendum in that the proposition to change the constitution comes from the population and not from the parliament. The authorities, even if they don't like it, cannot prevent an initiative which has collected enough signatures from being held, but they can make a counter proposal, known as counter-project.

A double majority of people and cantons is required to change the constitution.

Popular initiatives exist at the federal, cantonal, and municipal levels.

Suggested revisions
At the time of its introduction to the Swiss Constitution in 1891, the federal initiative system was initially meant to let groups that were not represented in the parliamentary process voice their concerns.

Since the 2000s, it has been increasingly used by political parties to bypass the parliamentary process. Some critics argue that it undermines the whole Swiss political system, based on compromise and adaptation to one another, as it suppresses any possibility to negotiate on an issue (an initiative can only be accepted or rejected as a whole). Others argue that it is democracy in its purest form.

Critics also argue that the multiplication of initiatives undermines the stability of the legal framework, as initiatives proposing drastic reforms are more and more frequent.

Cantonal popular initiative

Municipal popular initiative

See also
 Swiss Federal Constitution
 Voting in Switzerland
 Politics of Switzerland
 Initiative
 People's Initiative in the Philippines

References

Bibliography
Pierre Cormon, Swiss Politics for Complete Beginners, Editions Slatkine, 2014. 
 Vincent Golay and Mix et Remix, Swiss political institutions, Éditions loisirs et pédagogie, 2008. .

External links
Popular Initiatives 

Referendums in Switzerland